The Gravesend by-election was a Parliamentary by-election held on 7 June 1918. The constituency returned one Member of Parliament (MP) to the House of Commons of the United Kingdom, elected by the first past the post voting system.

Vacancy
Sir Gilbert Parker had been Conservative MP for the seat of Gravesend since the 1900 general elections. In 1918, Parker resigned his seat.

Electoral history
Parker had encountered few problems in holding the seat for the Conservatives, even in the Liberal landslide year of 1906. At the previous general election in 1910, Parker had a comfortable majority.

Candidates
Alexander Richardson was chosen to defend the seat for both the Unionist Party and the Coalition Government. He was a 54 year old engineering journalist and editor. He was standing for parliament for the first time. Due to the war-time electoral truce, he faced no opposition from either the Liberal Party or the Labour Patty. He faced two opponents, Alderman Henry Edward Davis running as an Independent Unionist and Harry Hinkley running as an Independent Labour candidate. Alderman Davis also supported the Coalition Government.

Campaign
Polling Day was fixed for 7 June 1918.

Result
The Unionists held the seat with a reduced share of the vote.

Aftermath
At the general election later that year, Richardson was again endorsed by the Coalition Government. He again faced Davis and Hinkley. Hinkley this time being endorsed by the right-wing National Party. The Labour and Liberal parties also ran candidates, splitting the ant-coalition government vote and Richardson thus won easily.

References

1918 in England
1918 elections in the United Kingdom
Elections in Kent
Gravesham
History of Gravesend, Kent
By-elections to the Parliament of the United Kingdom in Kent constituencies
1910s in Kent